UBC may refer to:

Universities 
 University of British Columbia, a major Canadian university with its main campus in Greater Vancouver
 UBC Okanagan, the campus in Kelowna, British Columbia

Athletics 
 Union Boat Club, a rowing and sports club in Boston, Massachusetts
 United Basketball Conference, a college basketball scheduling alliance
 University Barge Club, an amateur rowing club in Philadelphia, Pennsylvania

Businesses 
 Unclaimed Baggage Center, a retail store in Scottsboro, Alabama
 Union Bank of California, in the United States
 Union Banking Corporation, a former banking corporation in the United States
 United Bank Card, a payment and transaction processor in Pennsylvania 
 United Brotherhood of Carpenters, one of the largest trade unions in the United States

Broadcasting 
 UBC Media Group, a radio services company in London, UK
 Ukrainian Business Channel, a Ukrainian television channel
 Uganda Broadcasting Corporation, the state broadcast
 Ulsan Broadcasting Corporation, a television station in Ulsan, South Korea
 United Broadcasting Company, UBC was a US radio network
 United Broadcasting Corporation, a cable television company in Thailand

Science and technology 
 Ubiquitin C, a human gene
 Ubiquitin-conjugating enzyme
 Ultra Bright Colour, a mobile phone display technology
 Unipolar brush cell, a class of excitatory glutamatergic interneuron

Other uses
 Uncorrectable Block Count, number of blocks that can't be corrected with an Error Correction algorithm
 Unified Braille Code, an English Braille code
 Uniform Building Code, a model building code
 Union of the Baltic Cities, a cross-border cooperation organization in the Baltic Sea region
 United Baptist Convention, a generic term for certain ministries in the United Baptist tradition
 Universal background check, a regularly debated topic in gun politics in the United States
 University Baptist Church (disambiguation)